Formicariidae is a family of smallish suboscine passerine birds of subtropical and tropical Central and South America known as antthrushes. The family Formicariidae contains 12 species in two genera.

These are forest birds that tend to feed on insects at or near the ground. Most are drab in appearance with shades of (rusty) brown, black, and white being their dominant tones. Compared to other birds that specialize in following ants, this family is the most tied to the ground. The long, powerful legs (which lend the birds a distinctive upright posture) and an essentially vestigial tail aid this lifestyle.

They lay two or three eggs in a nest in a tree, both sexes incubating.

Systematics
The antthrushes are similar in appearance to small rails. Their sexes are alike in plumage, and they walk like starlings. The thrush part of the name refers only to the similarity in size (and in Chamaeza also coloration) to true thrushes, not to an evolutionary relationship.

Molecular phylogenetic studies indicated that the Formicariidae as previously delimited were highly paraphyletic, judging from comparison of several mt and nDNA sequences. The aberrant bar-bellied "antpittas" of the genus Pittasoma, which were formerly placed here, belong to the gnateater family (which initially was also considered part of the Formicariidae); as the gnateaters proper, they are sexually dichromatic. In addition, the true antpittas formerly placed in this family are now found in their own family, the Grallariidae. On the other hand, at least a large proportion of the Rhinocryptidae (tapaculos), including the type genus Rhinocrypta, seem to be closer to the antthrushes, but are still considered a distinct family.

The following cladogram shows the phylogeny of the antthrush family. It is based on a large molecular phylogenetic study of the suboscines by Michael Harvey and collaborators that was published in 2020. The species are those recognised by the International Ornithologists' Union (IOC).

The short-tailed antthrush was found to be paraphyletic. Eleven subspecies are recognised in several disjunct areas and ornithologists had suspected that more than a single species was involved.

References

External links

Formicariidae videos, photos and sounds on the Internet Bird Collection

 
Bird families
Higher-level bird taxa restricted to the Neotropics
Tyranni
Taxa named by George Robert Gray